The Distress Act 1285 (13 Edw 1 c 37) was an Act of the Parliament of England. It was chapter 37 of the Statute of Westminster the Second.

The whole Act was repealed by section 1 of, and Part VII of the Schedule to, the Statute Law (Repeals) Act 1969.

References
Halsbury's Statutes,

Acts of the Parliament of England
1280s in law
1285 in England